The Hares Hill Road Bridge is a single-span, wrought iron, bowstring-shaped lattice girder bridge. It was built in 1869 by Moseley Iron Bridge and Roof Company and is the only known surviving example of this kind. The bridge spans French Creek, a Pennsylvania Scenic River.

Description
The Hares Hill Road Bridge superstructure consists of one  wrought-iron lattice girder span. The ends are supported on stone masonry abutments built by Abraham Taney Jr., also in 1869. The bridge has been extensively rehabilitated several times, one of which added the current open grid steel deck. This is a single-lane bridge.

The structure is listed in the National Register of Historic Places and has a high degree of historical and technological significance: it is the only known surviving example of Thomas William Moseley’s patented "Wrought Iron Lattice Girder Bridge." The bridge has been recorded by the Historic American Engineering Record (HAER) with detailed drawings, photographs, and a historical narrative. The structure carries one lane of traffic on Hares Hill Road (unsigned State Route 1045) across French Creek. Residences are located along the north bank of French Creek and a wooded area runs along the south bank.

The abutments are founded on rock and consist of random rubble mortared sandstone. Concrete pedestals have replaced the original stone-bearing seats.

The original superstructure consisted of the two wrought-iron arched girders with lattice webbing and a timber floor system. The arch girders are made up of a pair of "Z"-shaped bars riveted to a central plate diaphragm. Diagonal lattice members fill the web between the upper and lower portions of the plate. Each arch has seven vertical members that support the floor system, along with the lattice and bottom tie plate. Bowstring-type tie rods extend diagonally from the bottom of the center vertical on both sides of each arch.

The HAER narrative cites three major rehabilitation campaigns before 1991.

Known locally as the "Silver Bridge" due to its color, the bridge was yellow for at least a few decades. The bridge was returned to silver during rehabilitation in 2010.

In 2009, the Pennsylvania Department of Transportation (PennDOT) was programmed to spend $1.7 million to rehabilitate this bridge and improve its load capacity without interfering with its historical nature. On June 22, 2010, the bridge was closed for rehabilitation work including replacement of the open-grid steel deck with a new deck incorporating a concrete center section for bicycle use. The $826,689 restoration was expected to last until October 2010 and raise the load restriction to 15 tons ( metric tons). The bridge was reopened on December 10, 2010.

On June 11, 2018, the bridge closed for approximately ten weeks for the latest rehabilitation. PennDOT's contractor worked to rehabilitate the wrought iron through truss bridge by reconstructing damaged and deteriorated wingwalls; reconstructing stone masonry parapets with reinforced concrete; and installing powder-coated brown guiderail to protect the blunt ends of the parapets. In addition, the conserved historic plaque on the outside of the southeast wingwall was re-installed. A plaque commemorating this 2018 rehabilitation was also installed. The bridge reopened August 20, 2018.

See also

East Pikeland Township, Pennsylvania
Kimberton, Pennsylvania
Zenas King
List of bridges documented by the Historic American Engineering Record in Pennsylvania
Moseley Wrought Iron Arch Bridge

References

External links

Crossroads of Kimberton

History of Kimberton Inn
NBI Rating

Bridges completed in 1869
Bridges in Chester County, Pennsylvania
Road bridges on the National Register of Historic Places in Pennsylvania
Historic American Engineering Record in Pennsylvania
Tied arch bridges in the United States
Wrought iron bridges in the United States
1869 establishments in Pennsylvania
National Register of Historic Places in Chester County, Pennsylvania
Lattice truss bridges in the United States